Kizu (キズ) is a Japanese visual kei rock band, formed in 2017 by Lime on vocals, Reiki on guitar, Yue on bass, and Kyonosuke as a drummer. They have released nine singles and two live albums.

Career 
The band was formed in March 2017, when they mysteriously announced a flyer with a phone number. Four months after, Kizu made its first solo performance  which the 1,300 tickets available sold out in just one second. On October 10, they released their second single, "Kawazu (蛙 -Kawazu-)".

They released the single "Steroid" (ステロイド) in two editions on July 31, 2018. On November 20 of the same year, the group joined the European label Gan-Shin Records. The performance "0" on January 11, 2019 sold out in one day and the band announced the single Heisei (平成), released on March 19.

The single "Jigoku" (地獄) was released on April 28, 2020, also in two editions.

Members 
 Lime (来夢) - vocals and guitar
 Reiki - guitar
 Yue (ユエ) - bass
 Kyonosuke (きょうのすけ) - drums
Kyonosuke was a roadie for drummer Meto of Mejibray.

Discography

Singles

Live albums

References 

Visual kei musical groups
Musical quartets
Musical groups established in 2017
Japanese musical groups
2017 establishments in Japan